Gabriela Clesca Vallejo is a Haitian-Canadian model and beauty pageant titleholder who was crowned Miss Haiti 2019. She represented Haiti at Miss Universe 2019.

Personal life 
Gabriela was born in the Dominican Republic from a Dominican mother and a Haitian/Congolese father and raised in Haiti where she was taught  French and Creole before she and her family moved to Canada when she was a teenager. Gabriela is currently in her final year of International Development and Civil Law at the University of Ottawa. While pursuing her education she also works for the Federal Government at the Intellectual Property Office.

Pageantry 
Gabriela won Miss Supranational Canada to represent Canada at Miss Supranational 2014. 

She placed as a Top 20 finalist and won the Miss Congeniality award. She later represented West Ottawa at the 2017 Miss Universe Canada pageant where she was placed as a Top 20 finalist where Lauren Howe won the pageant. 

She later competed at a Haitian pageant for the first time, Miss Universe Haiti 2019, where she won and was given the right to represent Haiti at Miss Universe 2019, where she was unplaced.

References

External links
MissHaitiOrg

Living people
1995 births
Miss Universe 2019 contestants
Haitian beauty pageant winners
Haitian people of Dominican Republic descent